Noureddine Kacemi is a Moroccan former football defender. He last played for FAR Rabat.

Kacemi played for Morocco at the 2000 Summer Olympics.

Career statistics

International goals

References

External links

1977 births
Living people
Moroccan footballers
Moroccan expatriate footballers
Morocco under-20 international footballers
Morocco international footballers
2006 Africa Cup of Nations players
Olympic footballers of Morocco
Footballers at the 2000 Summer Olympics
Raja CA players
FC Istres players
Grenoble Foot 38 players
Ligue 1 players
Ligue 2 players
AS FAR (football) players
Expatriate footballers in France
Association football defenders
People from Mohammedia
SCC Mohammédia players